A sally saw is a portable, mechanical, motorized saw. 

It was used for limbing (removing branches from the stem of a felled tree), and bucking (cutting a felled and delimbed tree into logs).

Construction 

A sally saw consists of several parts:
 An engine (internal combustion)
 A drive shaft that transmits power from the engine out to the cutting blade
 A cutting blade - a circular saw, sometimes hidden within a guard

History 

The sally saw was created by the Cummings Machine Works in the first half of the 20th century.

References

Woodworking hand-held power tools
Saws
Logging
Habitat management equipment and methods
Gardening tools